An ice tank is a ship model basin whose purpose is to provide a physical modeling environment for the interaction of ship, structures, or sea floor with both ice and water.  Ice tanks may take the form of either a towing tank or maneuvering basin.

Many un-refrigerated ship model basins use ice simulants such as paraffin wax, plaster, and mixtures of foam or plastic beads.  The cleanup and handling of such simulants often proves cumbersome. What differentiates an ice tank from other ship model basins is that an ice tank has purpose built provisions into its structure for handling such material conveniently. Use of a refrigerated basin containing mostly water allows freezing and melting to be a convenient method of model ice preparation and cleanup.

Ice scaling
Ship model basins often simulate full-scale processes in miniature. Ships and structures are reduced linearly in size, and cubic in mass, displacement, and volume.  The challenge in ice modeling is correctly reducing the ice properties of interest to provide an accurate simulation.

Many factors and properties are of interest when simulating ice.  The actual environment that will be simulated is of prime concern.  For example, ice pieces flowing then jamming a spring river would be modeled very differently from a ship model traversing a simulated arctic ice sheet.  Different again would be a ship traversing an area of loose broken ice pieces or pack ice.

Weakened ice method
One important factor in icebreaker model testing is the effect of changing ice strengths and thickness.  For example: if a 1 to 30 scale is chosen, then the ship model is 1/30 the size.  The ice used must also be 1/30 the thickness and 1/30 the strength.

If one was to use pure-water ice, the problem is that pure-water ice does not soften.

Many ice tanks simulate ice using a mixture consisting mostly of water and chemical additives called dopants, which are chemicals which reduce the melting temperature of pure water ice.  Common dopants used are salt, ethanol, ethylene glycol, and urea.

By using a sufficiently cold temperature, both water and dopant are frozen in solution together forming an ice sheet.  This impure ice sheet is inherently softer than pure-water ice but may be much harder than the scale strength desired.  Once a desired thickness is achieved, the air temperature is raised to a tempering temperature.  As the temperature of the ice rises the dopants come out of frozen solution and form liquid brine pockets.  These brine pockets slowly drain out of the ice sheet thus weakening it.  Provided the ice-sheet isn't allowed to refreeze, the strength of the ice continues to decrease approaching an asymptotic value.  Choosing a correct ice scale then becomes a question of when to conduct the test.  This softening is often referred to as tempering.

Different ice simulants model ice differently.  For example, most icebreakers break ice by riding upward unto the ice and breaking downward by the weight of the vessel. In this case, correctly modeling ice's downward flexural strength is most important. In the case of bridges or offshore structure, compressive strength or upward flexural strength may be of more interest.  The effects of ice on ship propulsion often require model ice density to be reduced by adding controlled amounts of gas or air during the freezing process.

List of ice tanks

References

Ship design
Research
Water ice